Emil Clarence Hansen (Hanson) (November 18, 1907 — May 16, 1955) was a Canadian professional ice hockey defenceman. He played in seven games in the National Hockey League games for the Detroit Red Wings during the 1932–33 season. The rest of his career, which lasted from 1929 to 1944, was mainly spent in the American Hockey Association. Emil had five brothers who were also ice hockey players: Julius, Joe, Louis, Emery and Oscar Hanson.

Career statistics

Regular season and playoffs

External links
 

1907 births
1955 deaths
Canadian ice hockey defencemen
Detroit Olympics (IHL) players
Detroit Red Wings players
Ice hockey people from Alberta
Kansas City Greyhounds players
Minneapolis Millers (AHA) players
People from Camrose, Alberta
St. Paul Saints (AHA) players
Tulsa Oilers (AHA) players
Wichita Skyhawks players